Johann von Vásáry or János Vaszary (1899–1963) was a Hungarian actor, screenwriter, playwright and film director. Several of his plays were adapted into films including I Entrust My Wife to You in 1943.

Selected filmography
 Stars of Eger (1923)
 Peter (1934)
 A Night in Venice (1934)
 Hannerl and Her Lovers (1936)
 Mother (1937)
 Roxy and the Wonderteam (1938)
 Duel for Nothing (1940)
 One Night in Transylvania (1941)
 Love Me (1942)
 I Married an Angel (1942, based on the Broadway musical I Married an Angel based on his play)
 I Entrust My Wife to You (1943, based on his play)
  (1944, based on his story)
 Tell the Truth (1946, based on his play)

References

Bibliography
 Eric Rentschler. German Film & Literature. Routledge, 2013.

External links
 

1899 births
1963 deaths
Hungarian film directors
Film people from Budapest
20th-century Hungarian dramatists and playwrights
20th-century Hungarian male writers
Hungarian male dramatists and playwrights
Theatre people from Budapest
20th-century Hungarian screenwriters